Zone of Lyube is a 1994 Russian musical drama film directed by Dmitry Zolotukhin.

Plot 
The film shows a concert of the Lyube group in zones and prisons, the audience of which are prisoners, security guards, men, women and teenagers, each song of which becomes someone's personal fate.

Cast 
 Marina Levtova
 Nikolay Rastorguyev
 Fyodor Sukhov
 Sergey Sazontev
 Irina Rozanova
 Andrey Podoshian as Gypsy (elder brother) (as Andrey Podoshyan)
 Valeriy Garkalin	
 Aleksey Serebryakov
 Ekaterina Stepanova
 Evgeniy Vesnik

References

External links 
 

1994 films
1990s Russian-language films
Russian musical drama films
1990s musical drama films